Carl Leo Leegaard Holm (14 September 1927 – 24 January 2020) was a Danish footballer. He was part of Denmark's squad at the 1952 Summer Olympics, but he did not play in any matches.

References

External links

1927 births
2020 deaths
Footballers from Copenhagen
Association football forwards
Danish men's footballers
Boldklubben 1903 players